"Oh Child" is a song by German DJ and record producer Robin Schulz and Colombian Latin pop group Piso 21. The song was released on 22 June 2018 as the fifth single from his third studio album, Uncovered (2017). The song was written by Dennis Bierbrodt, Jürgen Dohr, Guido Kramer, Stefan Dabruck, Richard Boardman, Robin Schulz, Daniel Boyle, Pablo Bowman, Alejandro Patiño, David Escobar, Juan David Castaño, Juan David Huertas and Pablo Mejia.

Music video
The official music video of the song was released on 22 June 2018 through Robin Schulz's YouTube account.

Track listing

Charts

Weekly charts

Year-end charts

Certifications

References

2018 singles
2018 songs
Piso 21 songs
Robin Schulz songs
Songs written by Pablo Bowman
Songs written by Richard Boardman
Songs written by Robin Schulz
Songs written by Jürgen Dohr